Statistics of Úrvalsdeild in the 1944 season.

Overview
It was contested by 4 teams, and Valur won the championship. Valur's Sveinn Sveinsson, Sveinn Helgason and Jóhann Eyjólfsson, as well as Víkingur's Eiríkur Bergsson, were the joint top scorers with 2 goals. Íþróttafélag Reykjavíkur had initially participated but withdrew from the tournament after losing the first game 0-8 to Fram.

League standings

Results

References

Úrvalsdeild karla (football) seasons
Iceland
Iceland
Urvalsdeild